Off Course was a Japanese folk rock band formed by Kazumasa Oda and Yasuhiro Suzuki. They broke up after a farewell performance at the Tokyo Dome on February 26, 1989.

Their most famous songs are "Sayonara" (さよなら), "YES-YES-YES", "Setsunakute"(せつなくて), and "Love is Determination".

Members

Vocal and Keyboard

Vocal and Guitars

Vocal and Bass

Vocal, Guitar and Harmonica

Drums and Percussion

Discography

Albums 
 [1973.06.05] Off Course 1 / Boku no Okurimono (オフ・コース1 / 僕の贈りもの)
 [1974.05.05] Kono Machi wo Yukeba / Off Course Round 2 (この道をゆけば / オフ・コース・ラウンド2)
 [1975.12.20] Wine no Nioi (ワインの匂い) 
 [1976.11.05] SONG IS LOVE
 [1977.09.05] JUNKTION
 [1978.10.05] FAIRWAY
 [1979.10.20] Three and Two
 [1980.11.21] We are
 [1981.12.01] over
 [1982.07.01] I LOVE YOU
 [1982.09.21] NEXT SOUND TRACK
 [1984.06.21] The Best Year of My Life
 [1985.08.01] Back Streets of Tokyo
 [1987.03.28] as close as possible
 [1988.06.09] Still a long way to go

Singles 
 Gunshuu no Naka de / Hi wa Mata Noboru (April 5, 1970)
 Yoake wo Tsuge ni / Utsukushii Sekai (October 5, 1971)
 Osaraba / Kanashiki Akogare (April 25, 1972)
 Boku no Okurimono / Meguriau Ima (February 20, 1973)
 Mou Uta wo Tsukurenai / Hatachi no Koro (April 5, 1974)
 Wasureyuki / Mizu Irazu no Gogo (October 20, 1974)
 Nemurenu Yoru / Kinou e no Tegami (December 20, 1975)
 Hitori de Ikiteyukereba / Aitsu no Nokoshita Mono wa (May 5, 1976)
 Meguru Kisetsu / Runaway (October 5, 1976)
 Kokoro wa Kimagure / Anata ga Ireba (February 5, 1977)
 Aki no Kihai / Koibito yo Sono Mama de (August 5, 1977)
 Rondo / Omoide wo Nusunde (November 20, 1977)
 Yasashisa ni Sayonara / Toorisugita Yoru (April 5, 1978)
 Anata no Subete / Umi wo Mitsumete (July 20, 1978)
 Ai wo Tomenaide / Utsukushii Omoide ni (January 20, 1979)
 Kaze ni Fukarete / Koi wo Dakishimeyou (June 5, 1979)
 Sayonara / Shiokaze no Naka de (December 1, 1979)
 Umarekuru Kodomotachi no Tameni / Kono Umi ni Chikatte (March 5, 1980)
 Yes-No / Ai no Owaru Toki (June 21, 1980)
 Toki ni Ai wa / Bokura no Jidai (December 1, 1980)
 I LOVE YOU / Yoru wa Futari de (June 21, 1981)
 Ai no Naka e / Christmas Day (December 1, 1981)
 Kotoba ni Dekinai* / Kimi ni Okuru Uta (February 1, 1982)
 YES-YES-YES / Main Street wo Tsuhare (June 10, 1982)
 Kimi ga, Uso wo, Tsuita / Ai Yori mo (April 21, 1984)
 Natsu no Hi* / Kimi no Shiawase wo Inorenai (July 18, 1984)
 Midori no Hibi* / CITY NIGHTS (September 21, 1984)
 Call / 2dome no Natsu (February 21, 1985)
 Tasogare / LAST NIGHT (May 22, 1985)
 Natsu Kara Natsu Made / Zenmai Jikake no Uso (September 21, 1985)
 ENDLESS NIGHTS / EYES IN THE BACK OF MY HEART (November 30, 1985)
 IT'S ALL RIGHT-ANYTHING FOR YOU / IT'S QUITE ALL RIGHT-INSTRUMENTAL- (March 4, 1986)
 Motto Chikaku ni as close as possible / Tiny Pretty Girl (May 25, 1987)
 Kimi Sumu Machi e / Kimi Sumu Machi e -INSTRUMENTAL- (January 25, 1988)
 She's so wonderful / Hizashi no Naka de (July 25, 1988)
 Natsu no Wakare / Aitai (October 25, 1989)

*Also in the anime series Sonic X.

External links
 Official Universal Music Off Course website

Japanese rock music groups
Musical groups from Kanagawa Prefecture